Nishi (written: 西 lit. "west") is a Japanese surname. Notable people with the surname include:

Nishi Amane (西 周, 1829–1897), philosopher
Haruhiko Nishi (1893–1986), Japanese diplomat
Kanako Nishi (西 加南子, born 1970), women's racing cyclist
Kanako Nishi (author) (西 加奈子, born 1977), Japanese author
Katsuzō Nishi (西 勝造 1884–1959), technical engineer Japan's first subway project (the Tokyo subway) and Nishi Health System founder
Kazuhiko Nishi (西 和彦, born 1956), Microsoft executive
Kenichi Nishi (born 1967), video game designer
, Japanese actor
Norihiro Nishi (born 1980), football/soccer player
Takeichi Nishi (西 竹一, 1902–1945), Japanese army officer and Olympic gold medalist killed in the Battle of Iwo Jima, son of Nishi Tokujirō
Nishi Tokujirō (西 徳次郎, 1847–1912), statesman and diplomat, negotiator in the Nishi-Rosen Agreement, father of Nishi Takeichi
, Japanese baseball player

Fictional characters 
Kinuyo Nishi, a character from Girls und Panzer

Japanese-language surnames